The Asian Journal of Mathematics is a peer-reviewed scientific journal covering all areas of pure and theoretical applied mathematics. It is published by International Press.

English-language journals
Quarterly journals
Mathematics journals
Publications established in 1997
International Press academic journals